The Green Goddess is a 1930 American pre-Code film directed by Alfred E. Green. It was a remake of the 1923 silent film, which was in turn based on the play of the same name by William Archer. It was produced by Warner Bros. using their new Vitaphone sound system, and adapted by Julien Josephson.

It stars George Arliss, Alice Joyce (in her final film role), Ralph Forbes and H.B. Warner. Arliss and Ivan F. Simpson played the same parts in all three productions, while Joyce reprised her role from the earlier film. Arliss was nominated for an Academy Award for Best Actor in a Leading Role for his performance.

Plot
A small plane carrying three British citizens — Major Crespin (H.B. Warner), his estranged wife Lucilla (Alice Joyce), and pilot Dr. Traherne (Ralph Forbes) — becomes lost and is forced to crash land in the tiny realm of Rukh, somewhere near the Himalaya Mountains. The Raja (George Arliss) who rules the land welcomes them.

As it happens, the Raja's three brothers are soon to be executed for murder by the British.  When the three plane-crash survivors appear, the Raja's subjects become convinced that their Green Goddess has delivered  three victims into their hands for revenge.  The three are to be killed once the Raja's three brothers are dead. The Raja professes no great love for his brothers, as they had posed a danger to the succession of his own children, but he sees no reason to anger his people by protecting his British guests. When he becomes attracted to Lucilla, however, he offers to spare her life if she will become his wife. She refuses.

The prisoners become aware that the Raja has a telegraph, operated by the Raja's renegade British exile and chief assistant, Watkins (Ivan F. Simpson). Hoping to send for help, they try to bribe Watkins, but when they realize he is only leading them on, they throw him off the balcony to his death. Major Crespin manages to send a message before the Raja's men break into the room. The Raja personally shoots Crespin in the back, killing him in mid-transmission.

The next day, Traherne and Lucilla are taken to the temple of the Green Goddess. Once more, the Raja renews his offer to Lucilla, but is again turned down. Given a moment alone, Traherne and Lucilla confess their love for each other. Then, in the nick of time, six British biplanes appear in the skies over Rukh. Lt. Cardew (Reginald Sheffield) lands and demands the release of the couple. The Raja gives in.

Cast
 George Arliss as The Raja
 Ralph Forbes as Dr. Traherne
 H.B. Warner as Major Crespin
 Alice Joyce as Lucilla
 Ivan F. Simpson as Watkins
 Reginald Sheffield as Lieutenant Cardew
 Betty Boyd as An Ayah
 Nigel De Brulier as Temple Priest

Production 
The Green Goddess was filmed in 1929 and completed before Disraeli (1929) but was held out of release until later at the request of George Arliss because he felt that Disraeli was a better vehicle for his sound debut.

The Green Goddess first was adapted for cinema in 1923. Produced by Distinctive Productions, it was directed by Sidney Olcott and played by George Arliss, Alice Joyce and Jetta Goudal.

Adaptations to radio
The Green Goddess was adapted as a one-hour radio play on the January 6, 1935 broadcast of Lux Radio Theater, starring Claude Rains.

It was adapted to radio again by Orson Welles on The Campbell Playhouse on February 10, 1939 with Welles as The Rajah and Madeleine Carroll as Lucille.

Preservation status
The film survives with copies at the Library of Congress and Wisconsin Center for Film and Theater Research.

References

External links

Review at pre-code.com

Streaming audio
The Green Goddess on The Campbell Playhouse: February 2, 1939
 The Green Goddess on Theater Guild on the Air: October 20, 1946

1930 films
1930 drama films
Remakes of American films
American black-and-white films
1930s English-language films
American films based on plays
Films directed by Alfred E. Green
Films set in the British Raj
Films set in India
Films set in the Himalayas
Indian mythology in popular culture
Hindu mythology in popular culture
Sound film remakes of silent films
Warner Bros. films
Films scored by Louis Silvers
American drama films
1930s American films